Joseph Leonard may refer to:

Joseph Leonard (soldier) (1876–1946), U.S. Marine and recipient of the Congressional Medal of Honor
Joseph Leonard (priest) (1877–1964), Irish Vincentian priest
Joseph J. Leonard (1876–1962), commissioner of the Boston Police Department
Joe Leonard (baseball) (1894–1920), American baseball player
Joe Leonard (1932–2017), American motorcycle and racecar driver
Joseph A. Leonard, American architect, designer of Old Vedanta Society Temple in San Francisco

See also